Chasm Falls is a waterfall with a  drop located on the Fall River in Rocky Mountain National Park.

See also
Waterfalls of Colorado

References

Rocky Mountain National Park
Landforms of Larimer County, Colorado
Waterfalls of Colorado
Cascade waterfalls